The Orby Head Formation is a geologic formation in Prince Edward Island. It preserves fossils dating back to the Permian period.

Fossil content 
 Dimetrodon borealis

See also 
 List of fossiliferous stratigraphic units in Prince Edward Island

References 

Geologic formations of Canada
Permian Prince Edward Island
Artinskian Stage
Permian northern paleotropical deposits
Paleontology in Prince Edward Island